Frank Rufus "Flossie" Oberlin (March 29, 1876 – January 6, 1952) was a Major League Baseball pitcher for the Boston Americans and Washington Senators.

Biography
Oberlin was born on March 29, 1876, in Elsie, Michigan. In , while playing for the Milwaukee Brewers of the American Association, he was acquired by the Americans, and made his major league debut for them in September.

Oberlin pitched four games for the Americans that year, going 1-3, striking out 13 batters and having an ERA of just 3.18. Oberlin pitched 12 games with the Americans the next year before his contract was sold to the Washington Senators in August. He pitched 11 more games with the Senators, finishing his 1907 season with a total record of 3-11.

Oberlin spent  with the minor league Minneapolis Millers. He returned to the Senators for the 1909 and 1910 seasons. He finished the 1916 season with the NYSL's Scranton Miners before retiring at age 40.

On January 6, 1952, Oberlin died at age 75 in Ashley, Indiana. He was buried in Hamilton, Indiana.

References

 Frank Oberlin at Baseball-Almanac

1876 births
1952 deaths
Major League Baseball pitchers
Boston Americans players
Washington Senators (1901–1960) players
Baseball players from Michigan
Lansing Senators players
Fort Wayne Railroaders players
Springfield Senators players
Milwaukee Brewers (minor league) players
Minneapolis Millers (baseball) players
Utica Utes players
Scranton Miners players
People from Clinton County, Michigan